Jure Obšivač (born 28 May 1990) is a Croatian professional footballer who plays as a defender for Croatian club Croatia Zmijavci.

References

External links

1990 births
Living people
Sportspeople from Metković
Association football defenders
Croatian footballers
HNK Hajduk Split players
NK Dugopolje players
NK Istra 1961 players
RNK Split players
FC Atyrau players
Sepsi OSK Sfântu Gheorghe players
NK Domžale players
NK Široki Brijeg players
FC Sogdiana Jizzakh players
Croatian Football League players
Kazakhstan Premier League players
Liga I players
Slovenian PrvaLiga players
Premier League of Bosnia and Herzegovina players
Uzbekistan Super League players
Croatian expatriate footballers
Croatian expatriate sportspeople in Kazakhstan
Expatriate footballers in Kazakhstan
Croatian expatriate sportspeople in Romania
Expatriate footballers in Romania
Croatian expatriate sportspeople in Slovenia
Expatriate footballers in Slovenia
Croatian expatriate sportspeople in Bosnia and Herzegovina
Expatriate footballers in Bosnia and Herzegovina
Croatian expatriate sportspeople in Uzbekistan
Expatriate footballers in Uzbekistan